"System Addict" is a 1985 single by the British pop group Five Star. It was the group's first Top 10 hit, reaching #3 in 1986. It is also their second biggest-selling single, being certified silver by the British Phonographic Industry for sales in excess of 250,000 copies. It was the seventh and final UK single from their debut album Luxury of Life.

Track listing
7" single
 "System Addict"
 "Pure Energy"12" single:''' PT40516
 "System Addict" (M&M Remix)
 "System Addict" (Dub Remix)
 "Pure Energy"
 "Winning" (Extended Version)

Some copies of the 7" single were issued with a free cassette (FSK 002) of 12" Dub versions of "All Fall Down", "Love Take Over" and "System Addict".

All tracks available on the remastered versions of either the 2010 'Luxury Of Life' album, the 2013 'The Remix Anthology (The Remixes 1984-1991)' or the 2018 'Luxury - The Definitive Anthology 1984-1991' boxset.

Charts

System Addict 2005 

"System Addict" was re-recorded, with Ryan Tedder of OneRepublic producing, and remixed by Sleazesisters. This version was released 18 July 2005 and Peaked at No.180 for 1 week. The video to the remixed single was an updated version of the 1985 original version, with more graphics added to make it look like someone was on a computer "updating" the video.

Track listing
 "System Addict" (Sleazesisters 2005 Mix)
 "System Addict" (Shanghai Surprise Mix)
 "Funktafied" (Re-Mixed by Leon Sylvers III)

Other uses
On the second season DVD of Ricky Gervais' Extras there is a hidden feature that shows Shaun Williamson and Steve Merchant performing an almost candid dance routine to "System Addict".

References

Five Star songs
1985 singles
Songs written by Billy Livsey
Song recordings produced by Ryan Tedder
RCA Records singles
1985 songs